Pietro Micca is a 1938 Italian historical war film directed by Aldo Vergano and starring Guido Celano, Renato Cialente and Camillo Pilotto. It was shot at the Fert Studios in Turin. The film marked the screen debut of Clara Calamai, who went on to be a leading Italian star of the next decade.

The film portrays the life and death of Pietro Micca who was killed in 1706 at the Siege of Turin while fighting for the Duchy of Savoy against France in the War of the Spanish Succession.

Cast

References

Bibliography 
 Moliterno, Gino. Historical Dictionary of Italian Cinema. Scarecrow Press, 2008.

External links 
 

1938 films
Italian war films
Italian historical films
1930s war films
1930s historical films
1930s Italian-language films
Films directed by Aldo Vergano
Films set in the 1700s
Films set in Turin
Films based on Italian novels
War of the Spanish Succession in fiction
Italian black-and-white films
1930s Italian films